Arlette Holsters (born 21 June 1961) is a Belgian equestrian. She competed in the individual dressage event at the 1996 Summer Olympics.

References

External links
 

1961 births
Living people
Belgian female equestrians
Olympic equestrians of Belgium
Equestrians at the 1996 Summer Olympics
People from Deurne, Belgium
20th-century Belgian people